Youssef Abdallah Wahbi Qotb (14 July 1902 – 17 October 1982) was an Egyptian stage and film actor and director, a leading star of the 1930s and 1940s and one of the most prominent Egyptian stage actors of all time, who also served on the jury of the Cannes Film Festival in 1946. He was born to a high state official in Egypt but renounced his family's wealth and traveled to Rome in the 1920s to study theatre. Besides his stage work, he acted in around 50 films, starting with Awlad al-Zawat (Sons of Aristocrats; 1932) to "Iskanderiya... lih?" (Alexandria... Why?, 1978).

Early life 
Youssef Wahbi was born into an Egyptian family, from the Fayoum region. He was named after the place where he was born, Bahr Yussef and his father worked as an inspector in the Ministry of Water Resources and Irrigation.

Career 
In 1926, Turkish filmmaker Vedat Örfi Bengü approached Wahbi to play the role of the Prophet Muhammed in a European film which would be financed by the Turkish government and a German producer.  Whilst the President of Turkey, Mustafa Kemal Atatürk, and the Istanbul council of ulamas gave their approval to the film, the Islamic Al-Azhar University in Cairo published a juridical decision stipulating that Islam forbids the representation of the prophet and his companions. Thereafter, King Fouad warned Whabi that he would be exiled and stripped of his Egyptian citizenship if he took part in the film. Consequently, the film was later abandoned.

Wahbi started acting in the golden age of the Egyptian Cinema in 1932, he has also starred in several plays which he translated into many languages due to his fluency in English, French, and Italian, along with his native Arabic tongue. He played many roles that were different and unusual for both Egyptian film and plays. He once played the Devil and he later on wanted to play Muhammad but the media and Al-Azhar University, the authoritative institution on Sunni Islam, were opposed to the idea and he was forbidden from going through with it.

He is one of the most respected and beloved artists of all time in the Cinema of Egypt and several French and English companies tried to save his movies by reissuing them again.

Death 
He died in 1982, sick with arthritis and with a fractured pelvis, survived by his wife in Cairo, Egypt at the age of 80, Even though he comes from a very rich family, throughout his career and life his entire focus was the Film Industry.

Filmography

References

External links
 "Youssef Wahby Dead at 84; Dean of the Egyptian Stage", The New York Times, October 17, 1982.

1898 births
1982 deaths
People from Faiyum Governorate
Egyptian male film actors
Egyptian television actors
Egyptian film directors
Egyptian film producers
Egyptian male stage actors
20th-century Egyptian artists
20th-century Egyptian male actors